Julia Kern (born September 12, 1997) is an American cross-country skier.

Career
Julia Kern was born in Berkeley, California and grew up in Waltham, Massachusetts. Kern participated in three consecutive Junior World Championships between 2015 and 2017. Individually, a 9th place in the sprint classic at the 2017 Junior World Championships in Soldier Hollow was her best result. She won a bronze medal as part of the American 4 × 3.33 km relay team.

As a senior, Julia Kern debuted in the World Cup in the 2016–17 season. She participated in the 2019 World Championships in Seefeld, Austria, where she finished 19th in the 15 km skiathlon and 23rd in the individual sprint. As a part of the American team, she finished in fifth place in the 4 × 5 km relay. On 21 December 2019, Kern was on a World Cup podium for the first time in her career, finishing third in a sprint freestyle in Planica, Slovenia. At the FIS Nordic World Ski Championships 2023, Kern and Jessie Diggins won bronze in the team sprint.

Cross-country skiing results
All results are sourced from the International Ski Federation (FIS).

Olympic Games

World Championships
1 medal – (1 bronze)

World Cup

Season standings

Individual podiums
1 podium – (1 )

Team podiums
3 podiums – (1 ,  2 )

US National Championships
2019 -  Craftsbury, VT  1st, Sprint freestyle
2019 -  Craftsbury, VT  2nd, Sprint classic
2019 -  Craftsbury, VT  3rd, 30 km freestyle Mass Start

References

External links

1997 births
Living people
American female cross-country skiers
Tour de Ski skiers
Sportspeople from Berkeley, California
21st-century American women
Cross-country skiers at the 2022 Winter Olympics
Olympic cross-country skiers of the United States
FIS Nordic World Ski Championships medalists in cross-country skiing